The 1926 Bowling Green Normals football team was an American football team that represented Bowling Green State Normal School (later Bowling Green State University) as a member of the Northwest Ohio League (NOL) during the 1926 college football season. In their third season under head coach Warren Steller, the Falcons compiled a 4–3–1 record (2–1 against NOL opponents), finished in second place out of five teams in the NOL, and outscored all opponents by a total of 88 to 70. Hayden Olds was the team captain.

Schedule

References

Bowling Green
Bowling Green Falcons football seasons
Bowling Green Normals football